Poanes is a genus of skipper butterflies (family Hesperiidae) distributed throughout North and Central America. The larvae feed on grasses and sedges. The genus was erected by Samuel Hubbard Scudder in 1872.

Species
In 2019, several species were moved from Poanes to a new genus, Lon. The species remaining in Poanes include:
 Poanes aaroni (Skinner, 1890) – saffron skipper
 Poanes benito Freeman, 1979 – Benito's skipper
 Poanes massasoit (Scudder, 1863) – mulberry wing
 Poanes viator (Edwards, 1865) – broad-winged skipper
 Poanes yehl (Skinner, 1893) – Yehl skipper
 Poanes zachaeus (Plötz, 1883) – Zachaeus skipper

Former species
Poanes zabulon (Boisduval and Le Conte, [1837]) - transferred to Lon zabulon (Boisduval and Le Conte, [1837])
Poanes hobomok (Harris, 1862) - transferred to Lon hobomok (Harris, 1862])
Poanes inimica (Butler and Druce, 1872) - transferred to Lon inimica (Butler and Druce, 1872])
Poanes taxiles (Edwards, 1881) - transferred to Lon taxiles (Edwards, 1881])
Poanes azin (Godman, 1900) - transferred to Lon azin (Godman, 1900])
Poanes macneilli Burns, 1992 - transferred to Lon macneilli (Burns, 1992)
Poanes ulphila (Plötz, 1883) - transferred to Lon ulphila (Plötz, 1883])
Poanes monticola (Godman, [1900]) - transferred to Lon monticola (Godman, [1900]])
Poanes niveolimbus (Mabille, 1889) - transferred to Lon niveolimbus (Mabille, 1889)
Poanes melane (Edwards, 1869) - transferred to Lon melane (Edwards, 1869])

References and external links

 
Hesperiidae genera
Taxa named by Samuel Hubbard Scudder